Syzransky District is an administrative and municipal district (raion), one of the twenty-seven in Samara Oblast, Russia. It is located in the west of the oblast. Its administrative center is the city of Syzran (which is not administratively a part of the district). As of the 2010 Census, the total population of the district was 25,947.

Administrative and municipal status
Within the framework of administrative divisions, Syzransky District is one of the twenty-seven in the oblast. The city of Syzran serves as its administrative center, despite being incorporated separately as a city of oblast significance—an administrative unit with the status equal to that of the districts.

As a municipal division, the district is incorporated as Syzransky Municipal District. The city of oblast significance of Syzran is incorporated separately from the district as Syzran Urban Okrug.

References

Notes

Sources

Districts of Samara Oblast
